The Face of Marble is a 1946 American horror film directed by William Beaudine and starring John Carradine, Claudia Drake and Robert Shayne.

Plot
A doctor and his assistant attempt to bring back to life ones who have recently died.  The housemaid, Maria, however, has other plans...

Cast
 John Carradine as Dr. Charles Randolph  
 Claudia Drake as Elaine Randolph  
 Robert Shayne as Dr. David Cochran  
 Maris Wrixon as Linda Sinclair  
 Willie Best as Shadrach  
 Thomas E. Jackson as Inspector Norton 
 Rosa Rey as Maria  
 Neal Burns as Jeff, fingerprint expert  
 Donald Kerr as 2nd Photographer  
 Allan Ray as 1st Photographer

Release

Home media
The film was released on DVD by Shout Factory on October 1, 2013, as a part of its "Timeless Horror" movie pack. It was later released by VFN on August 7, 2018.

Reception

On his website Fantastic Movie Musings and Ramblings, Dave Sindelar stated that the film had some interesting ideas and featured a good performance by Carradine, but was undone by the lack of humor, and uninteresting romantic sub-plot. Dennis Schwartz from Ozus' World Movie Reviews awarded the film a grade B−, calling it "A goofy but entertaining 'mad scientist' cult film". TV Guide gave the film one out of four stars, pointing out Carradine's performance as the film's only worthwhile aspect.

References

Bibliography

Notes

External links
 
 
 
 
 

1946 films
1946 horror films
1940s English-language films
American science fiction horror films
Films directed by William Beaudine
Fiction about Haitian Vodou
Mad scientist films
Monogram Pictures films
1940s science fiction horror films
American black-and-white films
1940s American films